Martin Snape (31 December 1852 – 24 November 1930) was an English painter of the Victorian and Edwardian era.

Biography
Born in Gosport in 1852, Snape worked in a variety of media (oils, watercolours, engraving, etc.). He concentrated mainly on topographical subjects including landscapes from the Meon Valley, and shore and maritime scenes around Portsmouth Harbour and his home town of Gosport. He exhibited at the Royal Academy between 1874 and 1901.

Living in Spring Garden Lane, near Gosport railway station, Snape was associated with the Gosport area all his life. In 1922 he was commissioned to design the seal for the newly created Borough of Gosport (though the council logo is now a stylised modern version, the original design is still used by the Gosport Borough Football Club). In 1923 he was chosen to give the speech of welcome to the 91st Annual conference of the British Medical Association which was being held in Portsmouth.

He died in 1930 but his most famous painting, Forton Creek, one of a series, still hangs in Gosport Town Hall. Snape is buried in the churchyard at St Mary's, the parish church of Rowner. He had a great fondness for the village of Rowner, which was the subject of many of his paintings and was a personal friend of a former rector, the Revd Edward Prideaux-Brune. The new premises of the charity Gosport Voluntary Action has been named Martin Snape House in his memory.

References

Martin Snape 1853-1930 (Gosport Discovery Centre).
Martin Snape – biography (Richard Martin Gallery, Gosport).
BMA Archives, 1923 
Bull, M. Town Hall Art Riddle (Gosport,Solent Reporter, 31 January 1986) p1.
Fisher, S.W. A Dictionary of Water Colour Painters (Foulsham, Slough, 1972). 
Gates, W. G. & Snape, M. (ill.).Portsmouth in the Past (EP, 1925). 
Locke, S. Snape Exhibition Information (Havant, Havant Museum, 1985).
Snape, M. Scenes of Old Portsmouth (Charpentier, Gosport, 1924).
An art show takes sisters back to their childhood, uncredited, The News, Portsmouth, 19 September 1969, p7

External links

Snape on-line, searchable database of works, Hampshire County Council

19th-century English painters
English male painters
20th-century English painters
English watercolourists
Landscape artists
English engravers
English illustrators
People from Gosport
1852 births
1930 deaths
20th-century British printmakers
People educated at Burney's Academy
20th-century English male artists
19th-century English male artists
20th-century engravers